Lalong may refer to:
 Lalong, Myanmar, a village in Myanmar
 Lalong, Peren, a village in Nagaland, India
 Simon Lalong, Nigerian politician

See also 
 Lalung (disambiguation)